Moru may refer to:

 Moru people, an ethnic group of South Sudan
 Moru language
 Moru, Iran, a village in Bushehr Province
 Moru, Kerman, a village in Kerman Province, Iran